The World Intellectual Property Review (WIPR) is a bimonthly magazine providing news and analysis on issues in intellectual property. Between July 2011 and June 2012, the average number of copies per issue was about 5,200. All copies were distributed for free. The magazine is published since 2006 by Newton Media Ltd, which also publishes the World Intellectual Property Review Annual, a guide to "intellectual property developments in the past year."

See also 
 List of intellectual property law journals

References

External links 
 

Business magazines published in the United Kingdom
English-language magazines
Free magazines
Intellectual property law magazines
Bi-monthly magazines published in the United Kingdom